Swashbuckle is a television show on CBeebies aimed at young children which started airing on 6 July 2013. The show takes the format of a game show where children control a group of pirates. The show is one of CBeebies's most watched shows. It won the 2015 British Academy Children's Awards for Entertainment and was nominated in 2018.

Format 
The show takes place on the site of the shipwreck of the Scarlet Squid, in which three "naughty pirates" – a captain and her hapless shipmates – have stolen and hidden Gem's five jewels. Four children (known as Swashbucklers) compete in a series of games to try to win back the jewels, under the watchful eye of the ship's parrot Squawk. After two games, any remaining jewels are hunted against the clock as the children try to find them hidden within the shipwreck. If the children successfully retrieve all of the jewels then a wheel is spun to determine which of the three pirates must walk the plank into the gunge-filled Ship's Mess.

Cast

Presenters
Gem – Gemma Hunt (series 1 onwards)
Squawk – Conor McNamara (series 1 onwards)

Pirate captains
Captain Sinker − Ella Kenion (series 1-4) 
Captain Captain − Jennie Dale (series 4-5, 7 onwards)
Captain HeyHo − Sophia Nomvete (series 6)

Pirates
Cook – Joseph Elliott (series 1-6)
Line – Richard David-Caine (series 1-6)
Sandy Toes – Ian Kirkby (series 7 onwards)
Seaweed – Tyler Collins (series 7 onwards)

Episodes

Series 1 (2013)

Series 2 (2014)

Series 3 (2015)

Series 4 (2016-2017)

Series 5 (2017-2018)

Series 6 (2019)

Series 7 (2021)

Series 8 (2022)

Awards and nominations 
Swashbuckle won the 2015 British Academy of Film and Television Arts award for Children's Entertainment and was nominated for that award, but did not win, in 2018.

References

External links 
 Swashbuckle on cBeebies − BBC
 

2010s British children's television series
2020s British children's television series
Television series about pirates
British children's game shows
CBeebies